Akpet, also known as Ukpet-Ehom or Akpet-Ehom, is a dialect cluster of the Upper Cross River languages of Nigeria. The varieties are Ukpet (Akpet) and Ehom (Ubeteng, Ebeteng).

References

Languages of Nigeria
Upper Cross River languages